Nada Gačešić-Livaković (born 8 October 1951) is a Croatian actress. She appeared in more than fifty films since 1974.

Selected filmography

References

External links 

1951 births
Living people
Croatian film actresses
People from Požega, Croatia
Golden Arena winners